Anjil Nesam (also Romanized as Anjīl Nesām; also known as Anjīl Nesā) is a village in Kuhdasht-e Gharbi Rural District, in the Central District of Miandorud County, Mazandaran Province, Iran. At the 2006 census, its population was 451, in 118 families.

References 

Populated places in Miandorud County